Vetlanda Speedway were a motorcycle speedway team based in Vetlanda, Sweden.

History
The club was formed in 1946, and arranged their first meeting three years later. The team raced as Njudungarna and raced in the highest division of Swedish speedway for the first time in 1967, following their promotion after they won the second division in 1966. In their maiden season in the top league they finished runner-up to Getingarna, a feat they repeated again the next two seasons in 1969 and 1970.

The club were relegated in 1974 but bounced straight back after winning the second division again in 1975. The following season the club finally won their long awaited Swedish Speedway Team Championship and the underwent a golden period of success. They won the silver medal (2nd in the league) for three consecutive years from 1977 to 1979 and then they won their second Championship in 1980. Three second place finishes (1981 and 1982) were followed by four more Championships in a five year period (1983, 1984, 1986 and 1987). 

In 1986, the name Njudungarna was dropped in favour of Vetlanda.

The club were relegated in 1999 but won the Allsvenskan in 2002 and were promoted to the top division of Swedish speedway league, the Elitserien, they changed the name of club to VMS Elit in 2003. Their 7th and 8th Championships were won in 2004 and 2006 respectively. 

The club experienced another successful period from 2012 to 2015, winning the championship three times and bringing their number of titles to 11 (just 3 behind the record of 14 held by Getingarna).

The name Elit Vetlanda Speedway was adopted in 2018 and the club finished in the top four of the Elitserien from 2018 to 2020. In 2021, they finished 5th and were eliminated in the play off quarter final.

On 30 March 2022, Vetlanda Speedway applied for bankruptcy, which was approved by the Eksjö Local Court. The club also withdrew from the Elitserien.

Season summary

Previous teams

2019 team
 
 
 
 
 
 
 
 
 

2020 team
 
 
 
 
 
 
 
 
 
 
 
 

2021 team

References

Swedish speedway teams
Sport in Vetlanda